Pingping (or Ping-Ping) may refer to:

Pingping (payment), an electronic micropayment system in Belgium
Ping Ping (singer), Surinamese singer
He Pingping, recognised as the smallest adult in the world capable of walking
Jose Tejada (born 1958), Filipino politician
The original name of Bei Bei, a giant panda

See also

 
 
 Bingbing (disambiguation)
 Ping (disambiguation)

Chinese given names